(Charles) Ellis Lloyd (1879 – 7 May 1939) was a Welsh novelist, barrister and Labour Party politician. He was elected at the 1929 general election as the Member of Parliament (MP) for Llandaff and Barry, having contested the seat unsuccessfully in 1924. He was defeated at the 1931 general election, and when he stood again in 1935 he massively reduced the Conservative majority, but not by enough to re-take the seat.

Works
Love and the Agitator (1911)
Scarlet Nest (1919)
A Master of Dreams (1921)

References

External links 
 

1879 births
1939 deaths
Members of the Parliament of the United Kingdom for Cardiff constituencies
UK MPs 1929–1931
Welsh Labour Party MPs
Welsh novelists